Selma is a city in Bexar, Comal, and Guadalupe Counties in the U.S. state of Texas. It is part of the San Antonio metropolitan statistical area. Its population was 10,952 at the 2020 census, up from 5,540 at the 2010 census. Selma was settled by German and Polish immigrants in the mid 1800s.

The Retama Park horse-racing track is located in Selma.

History

Selma was settled in 1847 by immigrants from several European countries. The name Selma is a traditional German girl's name. In 1849, the Harrison and Brown stagecoach stop was built in Selma to handle passengers and freight on the San Antonio to Austin stagecoach line. John Harrison and his wife Martha moved to Selma in 1852, and he became the first postmaster of the town when the post office opened in 1856. Harrison was also co-owner of the Harrison and McCulloch stage line, which ran a postal route through Selma. Harrison's house still stands by Cibolo Creek, where it was built and is listed on the National Register of Historic Places.

German and Polish immigrants constituted most of the next wave of immigrants who settled in the area. By 1885, the population was 145, and at the turn of the century, the population peaked at 600. The population began a quick decline, so much that by 1906, the post office was closed. Selma's population dropped to 100 in 1940. The city incorporated in 1964 and has seen tremendous growth along the Interstate 35 corridor since 2000.

The Retama Racing Park opened in 1995, and The Forum, a 110-shop outdoor mall, opened in 2000. The old Harrison and Brown stagecoach stop was restored and rechristened the Selma Stage Stop, along with a visitor's center and park.

Today, Selma is a bustling suburb of San Antonio, but it retains its German and European heritage in its name and in the descendants of Europeans who still call this town home.

Geography
Selma has territory in Guadalupe, Bexar and Comal Counties. The coordinates of the city center, is located in northern Bexar County, but City Hall, at 9375 Corporate Drive, is located in Guadalupe County, across the border from the city center. The city is bordered by Schertz to the east, Universal City to the south, Live Oak to the southwest, and part of San Antonio to the northwest.

 runs through the south-central part of the community, with access from exits 173 and 174.

Demographics

As of the 2020 United States census, 10,952 people, 3,871 households, and 2,728 families were residing in the city.

As of the census of 2000, 788 people, 286 households, and 217 families were residing in the town. The population density was 161.9 people per square mile (62.5/km). The 298 housing units had an average density of 61.2/sq mi (23.6/km). The racial makeup of the city was 86.55% White, 4.57% African American, 1.14% Native American, 1.27% Asian, 0.38% Pacific Islander, 3.93% from other races, and 2.16% from two or more races. Hispanics or Latinos of any race were 30.46% of the population.

Of the 286 households, 33.9% had children under 18 living with them, 67.1% were married couples living together, 5.2% had a female householder with no husband present, and 24.1% were not families. About 17.8% of all households were made up of individuals, and 4.9% had someone living alone who was 65 or older. The average household size was 2.73, and the average family size was 3.17.

In the town. the age distribution was 25.4% under 18, 8.1% from 18 to 24, 24.9% from 25 to 44, 31.5% from 45 to 64, and 10.2% who were 65 or older. The median age was 40 years. For every 100 females, there were 107.9 males. For every 100 females 18 and over, there were 104.9 males.

The median income for a household in the town was $51,979, and for a family was $62,344. Males had a median income of $39,479 versus $27,222 for females. The per capita income for the city was $22,492. About 5.1% of families and 5.5% of the population were below the poverty line, including 7.8% of those under age 18 and none of those age 65 or over.

In popular culture 
The town was famous as a speed trap as referenced in the Steve Earle song "Guitar Town".  Texas Monthly published a feature on Selma in 1974, describing it as "the perfect speed trap".

Notable people
Kenneth Raymond Fleenor, brigadier general in the U.S. Air Force, mayor of Selma

References

External links
 City of Selma official website

Cities in Bexar County, Texas
Cities in Guadalupe County, Texas
Cities in Comal County, Texas
Cities in Texas
Populated places established in 1964
Greater San Antonio